Ross John Travis (born January 9, 1993) is an American football tight end who is a free agent. He played college basketball at Penn State and did not play college football. After going undrafted in the 2015 NFL Draft, he signed with the Kansas City Chiefs as an undrafted free agent.

College basketball career
Travis was rated as a three-star recruit by ESPN and Rivals and was considered one of the top college prospects in Minnesota. As a freshman, he played all 32 games starting 16, he averaged 4.4 points and 4.7 rebounds per game in his first year. He won the team's Scrappiest Player Award which is voted by teammates and coaches. In his final three years at Penn State, Travis averaged 7.0, 8.3, and 5.5 points per game as a sophomore, junior and senior. He finished his career with the Nittany Lions as a four-year letterman and played a career total of 133 games and started 98.

Professional career

Kansas City Chiefs
Having not played football since freshman year of high school eight years prior, Travis was signed to the Kansas City Chiefs' practice squad as an undrafted free agent on September 7, 2015. He was released by the Chiefs on September 14, 2015, but was re-signed on November 17, 2015. He re-signed with the Chiefs on January 18, 2016.

On November 27, 2017, Travis was waived by the Chiefs.

Indianapolis Colts
On November 28, 2017, Travis was claimed off waivers by the Indianapolis Colts. In his Colts debut, Travis had two catches for 33 yards.

On August 30, 2018, in the last preseason game against the Cincinnati Bengals, Travis suffered a torn ACL injury after catching a pass from quarterback P. J. Walker for a first down on 4th & 6, prematurely ending his 2018 season. On September 1, 2018, Travis was placed on injured reserve.

On February 26, 2019, Travis was re-signed by the Colts. He was released on August 31, 2019. He was re-signed on November 25, 2019. He was waived on December 27, 2019.

New York Jets
On December 28, 2019, Travis was claimed off waivers by the New York Jets.

On September 5, 2020, Travis was released by the Jets and signed to the practice squad the next day. He was elevated to the active roster on November 9 for the team's week 9 game against the New England Patriots, and reverted to the practice squad after the game. He was placed on the practice squad/COVID-19 list by the team on November 12, and restored to the practice squad on November 23. He was promoted to the active roster on November 24, 2020.

Arizona Cardinals
On May 25, 2021, Travis signed with the Arizona Cardinals. He was released on August 31, 2021, and re-signed to the practice squad the next day. He was released on November 2.

Cleveland Browns
On December 7, 2021, Travis was signed to the Cleveland Browns practice squad. He was released on December 24.

Detroit Lions
On December 28, 2021, Travis was signed to the Detroit Lions practice squad.

References

External links
Kansas City Chiefs bio
Penn State Nittany Lions bio

1993 births
Living people
Players of American football from Minnesota
Sportspeople from the Minneapolis–Saint Paul metropolitan area
People from Chaska, Minnesota
Basketball players from Minnesota
American football tight ends
American men's basketball players
Penn State Nittany Lions basketball players
Kansas City Chiefs players
Indianapolis Colts players
New York Jets players
Arizona Cardinals players
Cleveland Browns players
Detroit Lions players